Sohrab Janshed "Soli" Contractor (born 27 July 1938) is an Indian sailor. He competed in the Flying Dutchman event at the 1972 Summer Olympics.

References

External links
 

1938 births
Living people
Indian male sailors (sport)
Olympic sailors of India
Sailors at the 1972 Summer Olympics – Flying Dutchman
Place of birth missing (living people)
Asian Games medalists in sailing
Asian Games bronze medalists for India
Medalists at the 1970 Asian Games
Sailors at the 1970 Asian Games